Shan Mei is a village in the Fo Tan are of Sha Tin District, Hong Kong.

Administration
Shap Yi Wat is a recognized village under the New Territories Small House Policy.

History
At the time of the 1911 census, the population of Shan Mei was 94. The number of males was 42.

See also
 Kau Yeuk (Sha Tin)

References

External links
 Delineation of area of existing village Shan Mei (Sha Tin) for election of resident representative (2019 to 2022)

Villages in Sha Tin District, Hong Kong
Fo Tan